Prindle Volcano is an isolated basaltic cinder cone located in eastern Alaska, United States, in the headwaters of the East Fork of the Fortymile River, approximately 80 kilometers northeast of Tok, Alaska. It is the northwesternmost expression of the Northern Cordilleran Volcanic Province. The lava flow extends to the southeast, then turns southwest and continues in a river valley. 

Rocks forming the Prindle Volcano occur within, and penetrated through, the Yukon–Tanana upland which is a large region of mostly Paleozoic-Mesozoic metamorphosed and deformed sedimentary, volcanic, and intrusive rocks that are intruded by younger Cretaceous and Cenozoic granitic rocks. Xenoliths in the volcano's ejecta provide a sample of lower crust material.

See also
List of Northern Cordilleran volcanoes
List of volcanoes in the United States

References

External links

Prindle, Mount
Prindle, Mount
Prindle, Mount
Landforms of Yukon–Koyukuk Census Area, Alaska
Pleistocene volcanoes
Volcanoes of Unorganized Borough, Alaska